The National Television Award for Special Recognition is an award presented annually by the British National Television Awards (NTAs). It is considered the most prestigious award given out in the ceremony and is awarded to people or shows that have made a significant contribution to British television over a number of years. It is the only award at the NTAs that is not voted for by the general public.

History 
The Special Recognition Award has been given in every ceremony since the start of the NTAs, with the exception of 2014 in which it was substituted by the Landmark Award. The first recipient in 1995 was Julie Goodyear. In 2020, Sir Michael Palin used his acceptance speech to pay tribute to his Monty Python co-star Terry Jones, who had died a week earlier.

Winners

References 

National Television Awards